Tanny may refer to:
 Armand Tanny (1919-2009), a Muscle Beach bodybuilder
 Vic Tanny (c. 1912-1985), American entrepreneur, pioneer in the creation of the modern health club
 Tanny B. Crane (living), the President and CEO of Crane Group, Chair of the Board of Directors for the Federal Reserve Bank of Cleveland